33rd Street may refer to:

Stations
33rd Street station (IRT Lexington Avenue Line) a New York City Subway station in Manhattan
33rd Street–Rawson Street station, a New York City Subway station in Queens
33rd Street station (IRT Sixth Avenue Line), a former elevated station in Manhattan
33rd Street station (SEPTA), a SEPTA subway station in Philadelphia
33rd Street station (PATH), the PATH terminal station in midtown Manhattan
33rd Street station (CTA South Side Elevated)

Other uses
 33rd Street (Baltimore), Maryland, an east–west parkway
 33rd Street Railroad Bridge in Pittsburgh, Pennsylvania
 33rd Street Records, an independent record label based in Greenbrae, California
 Thirty-third Street Bridge in Philadelphia, Pennsylvania